O Xallas is a comarca in the Galician Province of A Coruña. The overall population of this  local region is 16,343 (2005).

Municipalities
Mazaricos
Santa Comba

Xallas